LLU is a three-letter abbreviation which may refer to the following:

 Alluitsup Paa Heliport (IATA airport code), in Alluitsup Paa, Greenland
 Latvia University of Life Sciences and Technologies (Latvian: Latvijas Lauksaimniecības Universitāte), a public university in Latvia
 Leisure Learning Unlimited, an educational organization
 Local-loop unbundling, in telecommunications regulation
 Loma Linda University, a religious university in California, USA
 long long unsigned, an integer data type, used in programming e.g. within a printf statement ("%llu")